"With Me Tonight" is a song written by Brian Wilson for the American rock band the Beach Boys. It was released on their 1967 album Smiley Smile. The piece has been characterized as "psychedelic doo wop" and the similar descriptor "do it yourself acid casualty doo-wop".

AllMusic called the track "one of the better (or, more accurately, refined) songs on the Smiley Smile album" and said that "the melody envelopes the listener in a graceful way, and, in this sense, makes it quite different from many of the other songs on the album." In the liner notes of the Smiley Smile/Wild Honey set, the song is described as "probably the best of the non-official Smile tunes on the LP."

Recording
"With Me Tonight" originated during the Smile sessions as "You're With Me Tonight". The intro was recorded as a vocal chant; later, it was expanded into a song for Smiley Smile and the "you're" in its title was omitted.

One of Brian's vocal instructions to the group was to sing the song while smiling.

At approximately 0:26, one can hear a voice say "good." This was thought to be an accident when Arnie Geller, a friend of Brian Wilson's, said it during the vocal take. The group liked it so much that they left it in the final take.

Variations
Early versions of the song entitled "You're With Me Tonight" appear on the compilations Hawthorne, CA (2001) and The Smile Sessions (2011).

Personnel

Smiley Smile version

The Beach Boys
Carl Wilson – lead vocals

The Smile Sessions version

Per Craig Slowinski.

The Beach Boys
Al Jardine - lead and backing vocals
Mike Love - backing vocals
Brian Wilson - lead and backing vocals, electric harpsichord, fingersnaps, handclaps
Carl Wilson - lead and backing vocals, bass guitar
Dennis Wilson - backing vocals

Session musician
Chuck Berghofer - double bass

Cover version
Sandy Salisbury (under the title "On and On She Goes")

References 

1967 songs
The Beach Boys songs
Songs written by Brian Wilson
Song recordings produced by the Beach Boys